The Taurisci were a federation of Celtic tribes who dwelt in today's Carinthia and northern Slovenia (Carniola) before the coming of the Romans (c. 200 BC). According to Pliny the Elder, they are the same as the people known as the Norici.

Etymology 
The etymology of the name is disputed. Taurisci may stem from a root meaning 'mountain' or 'high rock', although it has been demonstrated that it is not related to the neighbouring Tauern mountain. Another proposed etymology is the Celtic root * 'bull' (see Gaulish taruos).

History 
Affiliated with the Celto-Ligurian Taurini, the Taurisci settled on the upper Sava river after their defeat at the Battle of Telamon in 225 BC. Following in the wake of the Boii, they migrated to northern Italia and the Adriatic coast. The Greek chronicler Polybius (ca. 203–120 BC) mentioned Tauriscian gold mining in the area of Aquileia. Along with the troops of the Roman Republic, they were defeated by invading Germanic Cimbri and Teutons at the Battle of Noreia in 112 BC.

The identity of Taurisci and Norici has not yet been conclusively established: According to historian Géza Alföldy, the Norici were one tribe of the larger highlandic Taurisci federation, while the Reallexikon der germanischen Altertumskunde defines the Norici as Celts settling in the Regnum Noricum in present-day Carinthia, with the Taurisci as their southeastern neighbours. Other people settling in the region were the Pannonians in the south-east of Carniola, the Iapydes, an Illyrian tribe, in the south-west, and the Carni, a Venetic tribe.

Teurisci, attested by Ptolemy in Dacia, were originally a group of the Celtic Taurisci from the Austrian Alps established in North-Western Dacia at the end of Iron Age.

See also
 Teurisci
 Tauri
 Turin
 Negau helmet
 Noricum
 Regnum Noricum

References

Historical Celtic peoples
Gauls
Celtic tribes of Illyria
Ancient history of Slovenia